MS Sea Witch was a United States Maritime Commission type C2 cargo ship, the first of four pre-war hulls, built by Tampa Shipbuilding & Engineering Company, Tampa, Florida and delivered in July 1940. The ship was of the basic C2 design, rather than the more numerous C2-S, C2-S-A1, C2-S-B1 types and four C2-T hulls delivered December 1941 through March 1942. Sea Witch was one of the relatively few C2 types built with diesel engines.

Construction
Sea Witch was the first of eight C2 type motor ships of a series constructed by Tampa Shipbuilding & Engineering Company, Tampa, Florida powered by twin Nordberg diesels. The ship was delivered to the US Maritime Commission for sea trials 30 July 1940.

Commercial service
The ship was delivered to United States Lines to operate under charter with option to purchase from the Maritime Commission for operation on the New York, Baltimore, Philadelphia, Hampton Roads and Savannah direct cargo service to Manila, Shanghai and Hong Kong by their American Pioneer Line intended to be the fastest direct cargo service between the United States' East Coast and the Far East. On 15 August 1940 Sea Witch departed New York under the command of Captain Samuel Lee on her maiden voyage. On 23 January 1941, after the ship exceeded all guarantees during her first voyage, United States Lines announced the ship would be purchased.

War service
Sea Witch was requisitioned by the War Shipping Administration (WSA) on 26 January 1942 at Port Pirie, South Australia from United States Lines and allocated to the  United States Army under a Transportation Corps agreement with United States Lines as operator. Shortly thereafter Sea Witch successfully delivered fighter planes to Java in a failing effort to reinforce Allied forces there resisting the Japanese invasion of the Dutch East Indies.

Sea Witch, with twenty-seven disassembled and crated P-40 fighters aboard, departed Fremantle, Australia on 22 February 1942 in Convoy MS.5 that was bound for Colombo, Ceylon with troops and supplies eventually destined for India and Burma.

En route to Colombo Sea Witch and Langley were ordered to break with the convoy and proceed independently to deliver the aircraft to Tjilatjap in Java. The two ships proceeded north separately, but Langley was attacked and sunk by Japanese land-based bombers on 27 February, despite being escorted by two American destroyers sent from Tilatjap. Sea Witch arrived at Tjilatjap on 28 February, even as the results of the Battle of the Java Sea had sealed the fate of the islands, and unloaded the aircraft. However, the still-disassembled aircraft were later destroyed by Allied forces to deny them to the enemy. On departure for Australia the ship embarked forty refugee soldiers.

The ship was listed as part of the original Southwest Pacific Area Command's (SWPA) in-theater fleet and is shown as one of seven ships in the United States Army Forces In Australia (USAFIA) fleet and one of three assigned for an indefinite period. By late April 1942 General MacArthur reported he had twenty-eight vessels composed of twenty-one Dutch KPM ships and seven others including Sea Witch which was one of the vessels under WSA charter from the owners. The need for large ocean voyage capable ships was acute and SWPA's need was for smaller, shallow draft vessels for operation in reef-strewn waters and poorly developed ports, and Sea Witch was detached from the SWPA fleet in March, though still operating in the region. At some point the ship was converted to a troop transport with capacity for 1,907 troops.

Q2 split off south of Port Moresby and proceeded east to Milne Bay where Anshun would be sunk.

On 21 December 1942 the nature of the WSA charter was changed at San Francisco from Transportation Corps to a bareboat general agency agreement, still with United States Lines as operator, for more general service. The ship was allocated by WSA to Army troop transport requirements.

On 21 September 1943 Sea Witch departed Port Hueneme, California with over 1,000 officers and men of the 91st Naval Construction Battalion bound for Milne Bay, New Guinea and after a brief stop in Australia arrived on 21 October 1943 with the next five days spent unloading.

Post war
Sea Witch was returned to the Maritime Commission 24 June 1946 and laid-up at James River Reserve Fleet having made her last voyage into the port of New York. Sea Witch was sold from the reserve fleet to Dichmann, Wright & Pugh, Inc. on 25 April 1947 and that resold the ship to Caribbean Land & Shipping Corporation on 8 May 1947 at Hoboken, New Jersey. The ship eventually was sold to the Swedish company Rederi AB Pulp and renamed Axel Salen sailing under the Swedish flag. In 1951 the ship was sold and renamed Bastasen and again the same year renamed' Warszawa.

See also
Battle of Java (1942)

Footnotes

References

Bibliography

External links
Photo
Photo Equator crossing certificate "U.S.A.T. "SEA WITCH" dated 17 July 1943
Japanese Captured P-40 (Possibility, also noted in other modern works, that some of the crated P-40s may not have been destroyed.)

1940 ships
Ships built in Tampa, Florida
Transport ships of the United States Army
Troop ships of the War Shipping Administration
Type C2 ships
World War II merchant ships of the United States